Euphrasius may refer to:

Euphrasius of Illiturgis (fl. 1st century), Spanish Christian martyr, one of the Seven Apostolic Men
Euphrasius (fl. 2nd century), Greek Christian martyr, one of the Seven Robbers
Euphrasius (died c. 515), bishop of Clermont-Ferrand
Euphrasius of Antioch (fl. 6th century), a Patriarch of Antioch 521–526
Euphrasius (fl. 6th century), bishop of Poreč, namesake of the Euphrasian Basilica, Poreč, Croatia
Euphrasius (bishop of Lugo) (died 688)